is a run and gun arcade game developed by Saurus and published by SNK in 1998 for the Neo-Geo arcade and home platform. It has no connection with the first Shock Troopers game. 2nd Squad was re-released for the Wii's Virtual Console service in the North American region in 2012. SNK Playmore released it for iOS, Linux and Windows via Humble Bundle and Steam in 2016.

Gameplay 

The gameplay system has been drastically changed because only four characters are selectable and there is no team mode from the first Shock Troopers. The graphics use pre-rendered sprites and the action is more violent. A major new feature is an ability to ride some vehicles, as in the Metal Slug games.

Synopsis

Development and release

Reception 

Shock Troopers: 2nd Squad for the Neo Geo was given a positive review by Classic Game Room despite being considered not as good as its predecessor. According to Hardcore Gaming 101, "Shock Troopers: 2nd Squad is often viewed as a disappointing follow up the original. Just like with Gunstar Super Heroes, Shock Troopers: 2nd Squad really only makes the mistake of sharing its name with a superior game. If judged by itself, it is really a great game and if it had been released as a stand alone with a different name, it would be recognized as such, rather than as an inferior sequel." The Virtual Console release of the game received a score of 7/10 from Nintendo Life.

Notes

References

External links 
 Shock Troopers: 2nd Squad at GameFAQs
 Shock Troopers: 2nd Squad at Giant Bomb
 Shock Troopers: 2nd Squad at Killer List of Videogames
 Shock Troopers: 2nd Squad at MobyGames

1998 video games
ACA Neo Geo games
Arcade video games
Cooperative video games
D4 Enterprise games
MacOS games
Multiplayer and single-player video games
Neo Geo games
Nintendo Switch games
PlayStation Network games
PlayStation 4 games
Run and gun games
Saurus games
SNK Playmore games
Video games about terrorism
Video games developed in Japan
Video games featuring female protagonists
Video games scored by Masaki Kase
Virtual Console games
Windows games
Xbox One games
Hamster Corporation games